Digitale Gesellschaft (literally, Digital Society) is a German registered association founded in 2010, that is committed to civil rights and consumer protection in terms of internet policy.

History

Benjamin Bergemann is a spokesman.

One of the aims of the interest group is to build a campaign infrastructure, and also to reach people who are not internet-savvy. Their founder, Beckedahl stated that "more effective advocacy toward politics and economy" is also a part of their mission.

As of May 2012, the group has approximately thirty members. According to Beckedahl, the small number of full members is necessary to build an infrastructure before opening up to more people.

Issues

The group has worked on topics such as ACTA, Open government, open data, information privacy, telecommunications data retention, copyright, and net neutrality.

In 2013, they led a demonstration at Checkpoint Charlie, during Barack Obama's visit, against the NSA surveillance program PRISM.

References

External links

re:publica 2012 - Digitale Gesellschaft e.V.: Was war. Was werden wird.

Civic and political organisations of Germany
Computer law organizations
Privacy organizations
Politics and technology
Internet-related activism
Intellectual property activism
Civil liberties advocacy groups
Internet privacy organizations
Freedom of expression organizations
Access to Knowledge movement
Digital rights organizations